Island Health, also known as the Vancouver Island Health Authority, is the publicly funded health care provider in the southwestern portion of the Canadian province of British Columbia. It was established as one of five geographically based health authorities in 2001 by the Government of British Columbia.

Island Health provides health care to over 850,000 people over a geographic area of 56,000 sq km. In the early stages of the COVID-19 pandemic in British Columbia, Island Health had 96 intensive care unit (ICU) beds and 140 ventilators available, including 22 transport ventilators.

Communities
The region includes the communities of:
 Vancouver Island
 Gulf Islands
 Johnstone Strait
 Central Coast (part of)

The largest population center is Greater Victoria on the southern tip of Vancouver Island as the majority constituent of the Capital Regional District (CRD; population 383,360 as of the Canada 2016 Census), which also includes some of the southern Gulf Islands.

Outside of the CRD, the primary hospital serving the populous lower island is the Nanaimo Regional General Hospital, serving Nanaimo and Parksville.

The other three metropolitan communities on Vancouver Island which function as centres of primary care are Courtenay, Campbell River, and Port Alberni.

Service
The main hospitals serving the CRD are the Royal Jubilee Hospital and the Victoria General Hospital, with the smaller Saanich Peninsula Hospital providing service to the Central Saanich and North Saanich municipalities. Saanich Peninsula Hospital "was built in 1974 as an Extended Care facility and has grown to become a full service hospital with 48 acute care beds and 144 extended care beds".

Nanaimo Regional General Hospital is slated to receive a new $33.85-million intensive care unit in 2021. "It will replace what a 2013 Island Health report deemed the 'worst' ICU in Canada."

Campbell River and Comox Valley both have new facilities as of 2017. North Island Hospital Campbell River and District provides 95 beds.

Facilities
Island Health's 150 hospitals and health centres include:

See also 

Other regional health authorities in British Columbia

Vancouver Coastal Health
Fraser Health
Interior Health
Northern Health

Province-wide health authorities in British Columbia

Provincial Health Services Authority
First Nations Health Authority

 Other resources

List of hospitals in British Columbia

References

External links
 Island Health website

2001 establishments in British Columbia
Health regions of British Columbia